There are two teams that go by the Chattahoochee Valley Vipers.  The current team is an expansion semi-professional football team based in Phenix City, Alabama and are a member of the United South Football League.  The "new" Vipers were created in January 2010.  The current team's website is www.eteamz.com/chattahoocheevalleyvipers.

The old Chattahoochee Valley Vipers (or the Valley Vipers for short) were a professional indoor football team based out of Columbus, Georgia.  Founded by Brian Schwelling of Acworth, Georgia (former owner of the Johnstown Riverhawks), they were a 2006 expansion member of the American Indoor Football League.  Schwelling sold the team to Steven Roddy of Atlanta and Dwayne Robinson of Bermuda who operated the expansion franchise.  They played their home games at the Columbus Civic Center.

They held the distinction of winning the closest game in AIFL history.  In Week One, they defeated the Daytona Beach Thunder, 48–46, which was the closest game.  One week later, they topped that, defeating the Rome Renegades, 40–39.  Other than that, they ended the regular season at 8-6 and the SC's fourth seed.  They later fell to the eventual Southern Conference champion Rome Renegades 64–39.

On August 9, 2006, Columbus City Manager Isaiah Hugley announced the city's termination of the Vipers' lease on the Columbus Civic Center, ending their sole year in Columbus, Georgia.

Statistics

|-
|2006 || 8 || 6 || 0 || 4th Southern || Lost SC Round 1 (Rome)
|-
!Totals || 8 || 7 || 0
|colspan="2"| (including playoffs)

References

Sports in Columbus, Georgia
American Indoor Football Association teams
American Indoor Football League teams
American football teams in Georgia (U.S. state)
American football teams established in 2006
American football teams disestablished in 2006
2006 establishments in Georgia (U.S. state)
2006 disestablishments in Georgia (U.S. state)